Tolliella is a genus of moth in the family Cosmopterigidae.

Species
Tolliella fulguritella (Ragonot, 1895)
Tolliella truncatula Z.W. Zhang & H.H. Li, 2009

References
Natural History Museum Lepidoptera genus database

Cosmopteriginae